Isra University (جامعة الإسراء) is a private university in Amman, Jordan. It was established in 1989, the first scholastic year started in fall 1991. The university offers the Bachelor of Science (B.Sc) degree in eight majors, and graduate degrees in  Law, Pharmaceutical sciences, and Engineering management.

The university started receiving the first batch of students in the educational fields in 1991/1922. The main goal for the university is to be productive in all the educational aspects .

References

Educational institutions established in 1989
Universities in Jordan
Amman Governorate
1989 establishments in Jordan